Woodland Cree 228 is an Indian reserve of the Woodland Cree First Nation in Alberta, located within Northern Sunrise County. It is 75 kilometres northeast of Peace River. In the 2016 Canadian Census, it recorded a population of 150 living in 33 of its 36 total private dwellings.

References

Indian reserves in Alberta